Wandrille Lefèvre (born December 17, 1989) is a Canadian soccer player who plays as a centre back for FC Laval.

Career

Amateur
Lefèvre played with the youth teams of OC Perpignan, a satellite club of Montpellier HSC. In 2003, he moved to Montreal with his family where he played soccer with the Montreal-Concordia club.  He attended College Stanislas for secondary.

Lefèvre played four seasons for the Université de Montréal Carabins. He was named CIS Second Team All Star and RSEQ First Team All Star in 2008 and to the 2009 RSEQ Second Team All Star.

Professional
In 2011, he began playing in the Canadian Soccer League with the Montreal Impact Academy. He was a finalist for the 2012 CSL MVP award. Lefèvre made his debut for Montreal Impact (NASL) in the North American Soccer League on June 26, 2011 against FC Edmonton. In 2012, he trained regularly with the first team, playing eight MLS Reserve League games.

On February 26, 2013, Lefèvre signed a Homegrown Player contract with the Montreal Impact. On April 27, 2013 he made his debut for the Montreal Impact against the Chicago Fire as a sub in the 54' minute coming on for Alessandro Nesta.

On August 15, 2017 Lefèvre was loaned to the Ottawa Fury.

Lefèvre was waived by Montreal on January 18, 2018.

After a year away from the pitch, Lefévre joined Canadian club AS Blainville in the winter 2019. He made fifteen appearances for Blainville that season, scoring one goal.

In 2022, he joined FC Laval, helping them win the PLSQ title.

International
Lefèvre became a Canadian citizen in July 2015. He received his first call-up to Canada on October 2, 2015 for a friendly match against Ghana at RFK Stadium. Lefèvre earned his first international cap as a starter in the match, a 1–1 draw on October 13, 2015.

Personal life
Lefèvre previously held Canadian permanent residency which qualified him as a domestic player on Canadian teams for MLS roster purposes. On July 2, 2015 he became a Canadian citizen.

Career statistics

Club

International

Honours

Club
Montreal Impact
Canadian Championship (2): 2013, 2014

References

External links
 
 

1989 births
Living people
Association football defenders
Canadian soccer players
Soccer players from Montreal
French emigrants to Canada
Naturalized citizens of Canada
Montpellier HSC players
Université de Montréal alumni
Montreal Impact U23 players
Montreal Impact (1992–2011) players
CF Montréal players
FC Montreal players
Ottawa Fury FC players
Canadian Soccer League (1998–present) players
North American Soccer League players
Major League Soccer players
USL Championship players
Première ligue de soccer du Québec players
Canada men's international soccer players
Homegrown Players (MLS)
A.S. Blainville players
FC Laval players
Footballers from Centre-Val de Loire